Kingman Grammar School (now named Palo Christi Elementary School) is an elementary school building located in Kingman, Arizona, that was listed on the National Register of Historic Places in 1986.

Description
Kingman Grammar School is located on Pine Street and was built in 1928. The school is in the style of the late 19th and 20th Century Revivals. John S. Mulligan, Jr. was the architect and Pierson & Johnson were the contractors from Phoenix, Arizona. It replaced the Little Red Schoolhouse, which is a one-room school built in 1896. At the time, grades First to Eight were taught here. Today the school is known as Palo Christi Elementary School which teaches Kindergartner to Sixth Grades for the downtown area of Kingman.

See also

 National Register of Historic Places listings in Mohave County, Arizona
 Kingman Unified School District

References

School buildings completed in 1928
Public elementary schools in Arizona
Schools in Mohave County, Arizona
School buildings on the National Register of Historic Places in Arizona
Buildings and structures in Kingman, Arizona
National Register of Historic Places in Kingman, Arizona
1928 establishments in Arizona